The Trochozoa are a proposed Lophotrochozoa clade that is a sister clade of Bryozoa. The clade would include animals in six phyla: the Nemertea, the Annelida, the Cycliophora, the Mollusca, and the two Brachiozoan phyla, Brachiopoda and Phoronida.

References

Lophotrochozoa